Tris(cyanoethyl)phosphine is the organophosphorus compound with the formula P(CH2CH2CN)3.  It is white solid that is air stable, which is unusual for a trialkylphosphine.  It is prepared by the hydrophosphination of acrylonitrile with phosphine. The compound has been the subject of much research.  For example, it is an effective reagent for the desulfurization of organic disulfides.

References

Tertiary phosphines